George Mittelman is a Canadian bridge player. He competed for Team Canada at the 1993 Maccabiah Games in Israel.

Bridge accomplishments

Wins

 World Mixed Pairs Championship (1) 1982
 World Senior Teams Championship (1) 2002
 North American Bridge Championships (4)
 Senior Knockout Teams (1) 2006 
 Jacoby Open Swiss Teams (1) 1995 
 Keohane North American Swiss Teams (1) 1986 
 Mitchell Board-a-Match Teams (1) 1998

Runners-up

 Bermuda Bowl (1) 1995 
 North American Bridge Championships (4)
 Senior Knockout Teams (1) 2009 
 Reisinger (2) 1978, 1982 
 Wernher Open Pairs (1) 1985

Notes

External links
 

Canadian contract bridge players
Bermuda Bowl players